Café society is a fashionable lifestyle.

Café Society may refer to:

 Café Society (1938–1948), a New York City nightclub.
 Café Society (British band)
 Café Society (South African band)
 Cafe Society (1939 film)
 Cafe Society (1995 film)
 Café Society (2016 film), a 2016 film by Woody Allen
 "Cafe Society", a song by Al Stewart appearing on his 1984 album Russians & Americans